Peel was a federal electoral district represented in the House of Commons of Canada from 1867 to 1968. It was located in the province of Ontario. It was created by the British North America Act of 1867.

It consisted of the Townships of Chinguacousy, Toronto, and the Gore of Toronto, and the Villages of Brampton and Streetsville.

In 1903, it was redefined to consist of the county of Peel to include townships of Caledon and Albion.

The electoral district was abolished in 1966 when it was redistributed between Peel South and Peel—Dufferin ridings.

Members of Parliament

Electoral history

|- 
  
|Conservative
|William Elliott
|align="right"|1,414    
  
|Liberal
|Robert Smith
|align="right"| 1,325   
|}

|- 
  
|Liberal
|James Fleming 
|align="right"| 1,430   
 
|Unknown
|Robert Barber
|align="right"| 1,387   
|}

|- 
  
|Conservative
|William Armstrong McCulla
|align="right"| 1,711    
  
|Liberal
|James Fleming
|align="right"| 1,668   
|}

|- 
  
|Liberal
|Joseph Featherston 
|align="right"|  1,667   
  
|Conservative
|William Armstrong McCulla
|align="right"| 1,613    
|}

|- 
  
|Liberal
|Joseph Featherston
|align="right"| acclaimed   
|}

|- 
  
|Liberal
|Joseph Featherston
|align="right"| 1,891   
  
|Conservative
|A. F. Campbell
|align="right"| 1,425    
|}

|- 
  
|Conservative
|Richard Blain 
|align="right"| 1,705    
  
|Liberal
|Joseph Featherston
|align="right"|  1,592   
|}

|- 
  
|Conservative
|Richard Blain
|align="right"|  2,640    
  
|Liberal
|W. E. Milner
|align="right"| 2,524   
|}

|- 
  
|Conservative
|Richard Blain
|align="right"|  2,758    
  
|Liberal
|Edward George Graham
|align="right"|2,469   
|}

|- 
  
|Conservative
|Richard Blain 
|align="right"| 2,656    
  
|Liberal
|William James Lowe
|align="right"|2,340   
|}

|- 
  
|Government (Unionist)
|Samuel Charters 
|align="right"| 4,751  
  
|Opposition (Laurier Liberals)
|Benjamin Petch
|align="right"|2,499   
|}

|- 
  
|Conservative
|Samuel Charters
|align="right"| 4,892    
  
|Liberal
|William James Lowe 
|align="right"|3,732   

|}

|- 
  
|Conservative
|Samuel Charters
|align="right"| 7,047    
  
|Liberal
|William Ruston Perci Parker
|align="right"| 6,546   
|}

|- 
  
|Conservative
|Samuel Charters
|align="right"| 7,002    
  
|Liberal
|William James Lowe
|align="right"|6,294   
|}

|- 
  
|Conservative
|Samuel Charters
|align="right"|  7,112    
  
|Liberal
|William James Lowe 
|align="right"|6,847   
|}

|- 
  
|Conservative
|Gordon Graydon 
|align="right"| 7,132    
  
|Liberal
|William James Lowe
|align="right"| 6,962   
 
|Co-operative Commonwealth
|Joseph Maund
|align="right"| 1,036   

|}

|- 
 
|National Government
|Gordon Graydon
|align="right"| 8,486    
  
|Liberal
|George R. Farr
|align="right"| 7,638   
|}

|- 
  
|Progressive Conservative
|Gordon Graydon
|align="right"| 10,357    
  
|Liberal
|Stanley George Harmer
|align="right"| 5,489   
 
|Co-operative Commonwealth
|Robert Craig Smeaton
|align="right"| 1,788   
|}

|- 
  
|Progressive Conservative
|Gordon Graydon
|align="right"| 10,570    
  
|Liberal
|Stanley G. Harmer
|align="right"| 7,788   
 
|Co-operative Commonwealth
|Charles Donson Jenkins 
|align="right"|3,043   
|}

|- 
  
|Progressive Conservative
|Gordon Graydon
|align="right"| 13,487    
  
|Liberal
|Alfred Joseph Clifford O'Marra
|align="right"| 9,263   
 
|Co-operative Commonwealth
|James Adams
|align="right"|2,560   
|}

|- 
  
|Progressive Conservative
|John Pallett
|align="right"| 13,500    
  
|Liberal
|Alfred Joseph Clifford O'Marra
|align="right"| 8,944   
 
|Co-operative Commonwealth
|Lloyd Hartis Gane
|align="right"| 1,985   
|}

|- 
  
|Progressive Conservative
|John Pallett
|align="right"| 19,818    
  
|Liberal
|Robert Speck 
|align="right"|10,467   
 
|Co-operative Commonwealth
|John R. W. Whitehouse 
|align="right"| 3,418   

|}

|- 
  
|Progressive Conservative
|John Pallett 
|align="right"| 23,379    
  
|Liberal
|Bob Fasken
|align="right"| 10,357   
 
|Co-operative Commonwealth
|John R. W. Whitehouse
|align="right"|3,848   

|}

|- 
  
|Liberal
|Bruce Beer 
|align="right"| 21,221   
  
|Progressive Conservative
|John Pallett
|align="right"| 19,238    
 
|New Democratic
|Patrick Lawlor
|align="right"|8,341   

|}

|- 
  
|Liberal
|Bruce Beer 
|align="right"|28,009   
  
|Progressive Conservative
|John Fox
|align="right"| 15,921    
 
|New Democratic
|Patrick Lawlor
|align="right"|8,836   

|}

|- 
  
|Liberal
|Bruce Beer 
|align="right"| 29,057   
  
|Progressive Conservative
|Ron Searle  
|align="right"| 17,955    
 
|New Democratic
|Keith Woollard
|align="right"| 13,404   

|}

See also 

 List of Canadian federal electoral districts
 Past Canadian electoral districts

External links 

 Website of the Parliament of Canada

Former federal electoral districts of Ontario
Politics of Brampton